Dorfbeuern (Central Bavarian: Dorfbeian) is a municipality in the district of Salzburg-Umgebung in the state of Salzburg in Austria.

Geography

Dorfbeuern is situated in the district Salzburg-Umgebung, 30 km north of Salzburg on the boundary with Upper Austria. 

The municipality consist of Dorfbeuern, Michaelbeuern and Vorau and some small hamlets.

Sights
The economic and cultural center of Dorfbeuern is Michaelbeuern Abbey, a  Benedictine Abbey founded in the 8th century. The Abbey runs a school for pupils from 10 to 14 years (Hauptschule) following a tradition going back to the 13th century, when a school in the abbey was first mentioned.

Politics
The local council consists of 13 members, 10 from the conservative ÖVP and 3 from the SPÖ (Labour). The mayor of Dorfbeuern is Adolf Hinterhauser (ÖVP).

References

Cities and towns in Salzburg-Umgebung District